List of military units raised by the state of Rhode Island during the American Civil War.

Artillery units

Cavalry

Infantry

Miscellaneous
 Independent Company Hospital Guards

See also

 Rhode Island in the American Civil War
 Lists of American Civil War Regiments by State
 United States Colored Troops

Notes

Civil War regiments
Rhode Island